Neddungayil Sankunni Narayanan (NSN) Matriculation School is a higher secondary school in Chromepet, India. It is run by the NSN Education Committee based on Chennai.

History
The NSN Matriculation School was founded as a primary school in 1968 by Lalitha Menon in honour of her late husband NSN Menon. It has since grown into an institution with around 1,700 students. The school is managed by the NSN Education Committee.

The school celebrated its Silver Jubilee in 1993 and its Golden Jubilee in 2018.

Other activities
NSN school has a Bharat Scouts and Guides group. It won the International School Award in 2015 announced by the British Council.

References

Primary schools in Tamil Nadu
High schools and secondary schools in Chennai
Educational institutions established in 1968
1968 establishments in Madras State